Okitsu (written: 興津 or 沖津) is a Japanese surname. Notable people with the surname include:

, Japanese footballer
, Japanese alpine skier
, Japanese voice actor

See also
Okitsu Station, a railway station in Shizuoka Prefecture, Japan
Okitsu-juku, a station of the Tōkaidō in Shizuoka Prefecture

Japanese-language surnames